Nigel De'ath (born 19 May 1965) is a former speedway rider from England.

Speedway career 
De'ath rode in the top tier of British Speedway from 1983–1990, riding primarily for Oxford Cheetahs. He was an integral part of the Oxford team that won the league and Cup treble during the 1986 British League season.

References 

Living people
1965 births
British speedway riders
Long Eaton Invaders riders
Milton Keynes Knights riders
Oxford Cheetahs riders